Spargania luctuata, the white-banded carpet, is a moth of the family Geometridae. The species was first described by Michael Denis and Ignaz Schiffermüller in 1775. It is found throughout northern and central Europe, North Asia and North America.

The wingspan is 30–34 mm. The length of the forewings is 14–15 mm. The moth flies in two generations from the end of April to September.

The caterpillars feed on various species of rosebay willowherb.

Notes
The flight season refers to Belgium and the Netherlands. This may vary in other parts of the range.

External links

Lepiforum e.V.
De Vlinderstichting 

Larentiini
Moths of Europe
Taxa named by Michael Denis
Taxa named by Ignaz Schiffermüller